Aleksa Vidić (born 29 September 1994) is a Serbian professional footballer who plays as a defender for Shirak.

Club career
From 2013 till 2017 he played for Sloboda Užice.

Career statistics

References

External links
 

1994 births
Sportspeople from Užice
Living people
Serbian footballers
Association football defenders
FK Sloboda Užice players
FK Mačva Šabac players
FC Smolevichi players
FC Minsk players
FK Budućnost Podgorica players
FK Zlatibor Čajetina players
FC Shirak players
Serbian First League players
Belarusian Premier League players
Montenegrin First League players
Serbian expatriate footballers
Expatriate footballers in Belarus
Serbian expatriate sportspeople in Belarus
Expatriate footballers in Montenegro
Serbian expatriate sportspeople in Montenegro
Expatriate footballers in Armenia